The Central State Eight Conference is a high school athletic conference in the Illinois High School Association (IHSA), based in Central Illinois.  While the name implies that the conference has eight schools, there are actually ten schools currently active, due to other schools changing conference affiliations.  The conference was established in time for the 1993-1994 school calendar year.

History
The impetus of the conference formation can be traced as far back as 1981-1982, originating from the remnants of the defunct Capitol Conference.  At that time, the existing Big Twelve Conference membership of Bloomington, Champaign Central, Danville, Stephen Decatur, Lincoln, Mattoon, Springfield & Urbana voted to drop Springfield and add existing Capitol Conference members Champaign Centennial, Decatur Eisenhower, Decatur MacArthur & Normal Community, as well as Rantoul.  As a result, the Capitol Conference dissolved, leaving its remaining members (Jacksonville, Springfield Lanphier, Springfield Sacred Heart-Griffin & Springfield Southeast), as well as Big Twelve Conference castoff Springfield, to find new homes.

Jacksonville joined the short-lived Greater Midwestern Conference (along with Chatham Glenwood, Hannibal (Missouri), Macomb & Quincy Notre Dame) for five years, then become an independent.  Springfield, Springfield Lanphier & Springfield Southeast joined Pekin, Peoria Bergan, Peoria Central, Peoria Manual, Peoria Richwoods, Peoria Spalding & Peoria Woodruff in the Mid-State # Conference (where # indicated the number of active members at that given time).  Springfield Sacred Heart-Griffin competed as an independent.  With these five schools desiring to re-establish local rivalries and reduce travel expenses, the Central State Eight Conference came to fruition.

Original membership included Chatham Glenwood, Jacksonville, Lincoln (from the Big Twelve Conference), Springfield, Springfield Lanphier, Springfield Sacred Heart-Griffin, Springfield Southeast & Taylorville (from the Apollo Conference).  Since its inception, Taylorville (following 2013-2014, returning to the Apollo Conference) has departed and Rochester (from the Sangamo Conference, starting 2010-2011), Decatur Eisenhower (from the Big Twelve Conference, starting 2014-2015) & Decatur MacArthur (from the Big Twelve Conference, starting 2014-2015) have entered. Lincoln has departed for the Apollo Conference following the 2016-2017 school year, with Normal University joining at that beginning of the 2017-2018 school year from the Corn Belt Conference. Lincoln High School is scheduled to rejoin the conference in the 2023-2024 school year. Quincy Notre Dame is expected to join the conference in 2024 for football only. The conference will then be split up into East and West divisions.

The conference is centered on high schools in the Springfield/Sangamon County (Illinois) area.

Member Schools

*Lincoln rejoins 2023
% - Multiplier

Associate member

*Notre Dame joins 2024 football only
% - Multiplier

Former Member High Schools

Membership timeline 
Beginning in 1993, the Central State Eight Conference competes in 11 boys, 13 girls and 13 coed sports and activities within the IHSA.

References

External links
Illinois High School Association (IHSA) official website

Illinois high school sports conferences
Education in Christian County, Illinois
Education in Logan County, Illinois
Education in Macon County, Illinois
Education in McLean County, Illinois
Education in Morgan County, Illinois
Education in Sangamon County, Illinois